BL4 could refer to:

 BL4, a postcode district in the BL postcode area
 Biosafety level 4
 A challenge run of the game Bloodborne